Karl Garside (born 4 February 1997) is an English professional rugby union player who plays as a prop for RFU Championship side Doncaster Knights. He previously worked as a barman and a PE teacher

References

External links
 Northampton Saints Bio

1997 births
Living people
English rugby union players
English schoolteachers
Northampton Saints players
Rugby union players from Harlow
Rugby union props